Mark Randall Volman (born April 19, 1947) is an American vocalist, guitarist, and songwriter, best known as a founding member of the 1960s rock band The Turtles, and, along with his bandmate and friend Howard Kaylan, a member of the 1970s rock duo Flo & Eddie, where he used the pseudonym Flo (abbreviation from Phlorescent Leech). Volman also became a stand-out figure upon joining Frank Zappa's band, The Mothers of Invention.

Early life
Volman was born in Los Angeles, California, on April 19, 1947.  He grew up in Westchester, a suburb of Los Angeles, where he performed in the proto-Turtles band the Crossfires and graduated from Westchester High School in 1965.

Career

Music and film

Volman and Howard Kaylan were founding members of the Turtles, a popular band of the late 1960s. In December 1968, NME magazine reported that Volman had insured his distinctive frizzy hair for US$100,000 against fire, theft or loss due to illness. As their band folded, Volman and Kaylan discovered that the terms of their contract forbade them to use not only the name 'The Turtles', but also their own names. Kaylan and Volman were recruited by Frank Zappa, joining the Mothers of Invention, and they also worked together as Flo & Eddie in music, in film (they provided music and voices for animated films like Down and Dirty Duck), and in radio broadcasting. In 1971 Volman appeared on the soundtrack to Zappa's humorous pseudo-documentary film, 200 Motels.

In 2015, Kaylan and Volman celebrated their 50th year, touring and performing more than 60 concerts a year, billed as "The Turtles ... Featuring Flo & Eddie" with their Happy Together Tour, a classic revue-format show featuring some popular bands of the mid-to-late 1960s musical era. During this tour in 2015, Volman was diagnosed with throat cancer, but was declared cancer-free in 2016. According to The Hollywood Reporter, Volman and Kaylan have been "leading the charge against the uncompensated use of their music — and using state-based misappropriation, conversation and unfair competition claims because sound recordings only began falling under federal copyright protection in 1972."

Academia
In 1992, at age 45, Volman started his bachelor's degree at Loyola Marymount University. He was an active undergraduate member of the choir and a Founding Father of the California Chi chapter of Sigma Phi Epsilon fraternity. Volman graduated with a B.A. degree in 1997 magna cum laude and was the class valedictorian speaker. During the speech he led the graduates in a chorus of "Happy Together". CBS Evening News covered Volman's graduation and interviewed his parents, who were perplexed at their son's academic accomplishments.

Volman earned a Master's degree in Fine Arts with an emphasis in screenwriting in 1999, also from Loyola. Since that time, he has taught Music Business & Industry courses in the Communications and Fine Arts department at Loyola. He has also taught courses in the Commercial Music Program at Los Angeles Valley College. He is currently an Associate Professor and Coordinator of the Entertainment Industry Studies Program at Belmont University, in the Mike Curb College of Entertainment and Music Business and conducts seminars about the music industry for various academic institutions from junior high school to university level.  In addition, he offers consulting on music business and entertainment through the website Ask Professor Flo.

Personal life
Volman married high school sweetheart Patricia Lee Hickey in January 1967 and they were married for 25 years. The couple had two daughters, Sarina Marie and Hallie Rae Volman. Volman married his second wife Emily in 2000.

References

External links
 Official website
 Ask Professor Flo, a business and website run by Volman and his wife to aid up and coming musicians
 

1947 births
Living people
American rock singers
American male singers
Loyola Marymount University alumni
The Mothers of Invention members
The Turtles members
American rock guitarists
American male guitarists
Guitarists from Los Angeles
20th-century American guitarists
Westchester High School (Los Angeles) alumni